The Babalon Working was a series of magic ceremonies or rituals performed from January to March 1946 by author, pioneer rocket-fuel scientist and occultist Jack Parsons and Scientology founder L. Ron Hubbard.  This ritual was essentially designed to manifest an individual incarnation of the archetypal divine feminine called Babalon. The project was based on the ideas of Aleister Crowley, and his description of a similar project in his 1917 novel Moonchild.

Rituals of the working
Almost immediately after Parsons declared that the first of the series of rituals was complete and successful, he met Marjorie Cameron in his own home, and regarded her as the elemental that he and Hubbard had called through the ritual. Soon Parsons began the next stage of the series, an attempt to conceive a child through sex magic workings. Although no child was conceived, this did not affect the result of the ritual to that point. Parsons and Cameron, who Parsons now regarded as the Scarlet Woman, Babalon, called forth by the ritual, soon married.

The rituals performed drew largely upon rituals and sex magic described by English author and occult teacher Aleister Crowley.  Crowley was in correspondence with Parsons during the course of the Babalon Working, and warned Parsons of his potential overreactions to the magic he was performing, while simultaneously deriding Parsons' work to others.

Liber 49, The Book of Babalon
A brief text entitled Liber 49, self-referenced within the text as The Book of Babalon, was written by Jack Parsons as a transmission from the goddess or force called 'Babalon' received by him during the Babalon Working.  Parsons wrote that Liber 49 constituted a fourth chapter of Crowley's Liber AL Vel Legis (The Book of the Law), the holy text of Thelema.

See also
Goddess movement
Libri of Aleister Crowley
Scientology and the occult
Works of Aleister Crowley

References

Further reading
 Entire issue dedicated to the Babalon Working.

Ceremonial magic
L. Ron Hubbard
Magic rituals